Labeo potail is a species of fish in the genus Labeo from the Western Ghats in Karnataka, Kerala and Maharashtra.

References 

Potail
Cyprinid fish of Asia
Fauna of the Western Ghats
Freshwater fish of India
Taxa named by William Henry Sykes
Fish described in 1839